Thiruttu Rail is a 2015 Indian Tamil-language action drama film directed by Thirupathi and starring newcomers Rakshan and Kethi.

Cast 
Rakshan Raj
Kethi as Meena
Charan Selvam as Bhaskar
Imman Annachi
Rajendran
Shanmugarajan
Mayilsamy
Pasanga Sivakumar
Pandi
Sendrayan as Ram
Theepetti Ganesan

Soundtrack 
The songs are composed by Jayprakash.

Reception 
The film released to negative reviews from critics. The Times of India gave the film one out of five stars and stated that "In capable hands, Thiruttu Rayil would have made for an engaging action film, but for almost half its running time, the director, Thirupathi, choses to focus on the mundane stuff — scenes of young men drinking and talking pointlessly, and a romantic track between two uninteresting characters". The Hindu wrote that "There isn’t one redeeming aspect in Thiruttu Rail. The songs are mediocre, the acting bad, the story disconnected, and the comedy unfunny".

References 

2015 action drama films
2010s Tamil-language films
Indian action drama films